Vitali Vakunov (born 5 January 1991) is a Belarusian ice dancer. With partner Lesia Valadzenkava (Volodenkova), he is a four-time Belarusian national champion.

Programs 
(with Valadzenkava)

Competitive highlights 
(with Valadzenkava)

References

External links 

 
 Lesia Valadzenkava / Vitali Vakunov at sport-folio.net
 Lesia Valadzenkava / Vitali Vakunov at Tracings

1991 births
Belarusian male ice dancers
Living people
Figure skaters from Minsk
Competitors at the 2011 Winter Universiade